Edgar Douglas Kenna II (June 11, 1924 – January 28, 2013) was an American football player and businessman.

Biography

College football
Kenna played his freshman year at the University of Mississippi for the Ole Miss Rebels. However, following his freshman year, Kenna received an appointment to the United States Military Academy at West Point where he played for Army as a sophomore, junior and senior. Coached by Earl Blaik, he was a quarterback and halfback.

In 1944, he quarterbacked West Point's undefeated national championship team. He also served as the captain of West Point's tennis and basketball teams. In 1944, the basketball team lost only one game, while the tennis team went undefeated.

Post-college
Once World War II ended, Kenna was recruited by General George S. Patton to coach Army football teams inside of occupied Germany. He also was later an assistant coach, under Earl Blaik, at West Point for a time. Serving on numerous boards, Kenna later held executive positions for several major companies, including Avco Corporation, Mississippi Power, Fuqua Industries, Robert B. Anderson Ltd., G.L. Ohrstrom & Company and Carrier Corporation. He later served as the president of the National Association of Manufacturers and became a founding director of the US-USSR Trade and Economic Council, which was based on an NAM proposal called the Council for American-Soviet Trade.

Death
Kenna died in North Palm Beach, Florida, where he had lived for years, on January 28, 2013.

References

External links

1924 births
2013 deaths
American football quarterbacks
Army Black Knights football coaches
Army Black Knights football players
Army Black Knights men's basketball players
Army Black Knights men's tennis players
College Football Hall of Fame inductees
Players of American football from Jackson, Mississippi
People from North Palm Beach, Florida
American men's basketball players
American expatriates in Germany
United States Army personnel of World War II